Indian Summer ( / Siromashko Lyato) is a 1973 Bulgarian comedy-drama film directed by Milen Nikolov and written by Mormarevi Brothers. The film stars Georgi Partsalev, Tatyana Lolova, Ivan Kondov, Itzhak Fintzi and Leda Taseva. The movie was distributed in the U.S. by Analysis Film Releasing Corp.

Plot
The day that the financial clerk Metodi Rashkov retires finally arrives. He is a shy and quiet man and he accepts all tasks given to him by his son and daughter-in-law without argument. With time, he becomes a housekeeper; he shops, cooks and looks after his grandson. In order to save face in front of his friends he lies to them and becomes embroiled in a variety of uncomfortable situations. The "expolsion" is imminent. Rashkov leaves his home. Soon the freedom which he wanted becomes boring for him. The abandoned family begins to miss the grandfather. Eventually everyone acknowledges their mistakes and make amends. The birth of a second grandson is the event which brings everyone under the same roof again.

Cast

Response
A reported 947,814 admissions were recorded for the film in cinemas throughout Bulgaria.

The film was subsumed among the 50 golden Bulgarian films in the book by the journalist Pencho Kovachev. The book was published in 2008 by "Zahariy Stoyanov" publishing house.

Notes

References
The film in the Bulgarian National Television 
Pencho Kovachev, 50 Golden Bulgarian Films, Zahariy Stoyanov 2008

External links
 

1970s Bulgarian-language films
Bulgarian comedy-drama films
Films set in Bulgaria
Films shot in Bulgaria
1973 films
1973 comedy-drama films